Paraderpas decellei is a species of beetle in the family Cerambycidae, and the only species in the genus Paraderpas. It was described by Breuning in 1968.

References

Ancylonotini
Beetles described in 1968
Monotypic beetle genera